Mystacoleucus chilopterus is a species of cyprinid in the genus Mystacoleucus. It is not considered threatened or endangered.

References

Cyprinidae
Cyprinid fish of Asia